Halotydeus destructor is a species of earth mites in the family of Penthaleidae, first described by Tucker in 1925 as Penthaleus destructor.

Pest status
This species is a major winter pest of a variety of crops and pastures in southern Australia. As a major pest, it has been the subject of much study: some studies looking at its response to pesticides, others at biological controls, some at both, and others at its spread and potential spread.

References

External links 

 Images & occurrence data from ALA

Taxa described in 1925
Trombidiformes